Joseph Almosnino (1642–1689) was the son of Isaac and grandson of Moses ben Baruch Almosnino.  He was rabbi at Belgrade, and author of numerous responsa, collected by his son Isaac under the title Edut bi-Yehosef (Testimonies in Joseph) and published at Constantinople, 1711–33.

Joseph died at Nikolsburg, Moravia, in 1689.

References 

1642 births
1689 deaths
17th-century rabbis from the Ottoman Empire
Clergy from Belgrade
Serbian Sephardi Jews